Friends Creek Township is located in Macon County, Illinois. As of the 2010 census, its population was 1,450 and it contained 601 housing units.

Cities and towns 
Argenta
Newburg

Adjacent townships 
Creek Township, DeWitt County (north)
Nixon Township, DeWitt County (north)
Goose Creek Township, Piatt County (northeast)
Willow Branch Township, Piatt County (east and southeast)
Whitmore Township (south)
Hickory Point Township (southwest)
Maroa Township (west)
Texas Township, DeWitt County (northwest)

Geography
Friends Creek Township is the home of the Friends Creek Conservation Area, a 616-acre county conservation area that is the largest park physically located in the township.

Demographics

References

External links
City-data.com
Illinois State Archives

Townships in Macon County, Illinois
1859 establishments in Illinois
Populated places established in 1859
Townships in Illinois